Hodderville was a settlement adjoining the small promonotory making the junction of Wild Bay and Monk Bay, which lie within Bonavista Bay west of Catalina. The town was named after the first Postmistress Mrs. Edith Hodder.

See also
 List of communities in Newfoundland and Labrador

References

Ghost towns in Newfoundland and Labrador